St John's School is an independent school in Billericay, Essex for students aged 3–16. The school is split into Kindergarten, Junior and Senior School.

Notable alumni
 Ashley Banjo
 Jordan Banjo
 Jonny Mitchell Love Island (2015 TV series, series 3)
 Theo Stevenson
 Joan Sims (actress)

References

External links
 ISI Inspection report

Private schools in Essex
Educational institutions established in 1928
1928 establishments in England
Billericay